MasterChef Profissionais is a Brazilian cooking competition television series based on the format of the U.K. series MasterChef: The Professionals. The series premiered on Tuesday, October 4, 2016 at 10:30 p.m. (BRT / AMT) on Band.

Format
MasterChef Profissionais is a spin-off from the main MasterChef series, for professional working chefs. The winner receives a R$170.000 cash prize, a brand new Nissan Kicks, a year's supply on Carrefour worth R$1.000 per month and the MasterChef Profissionais trophy.

Series overview

Season chronology

Ratings and reception

References

External links
 MasterChef Profissionais on Band
 

2016 Brazilian television series debuts
Portuguese-language television shows
MasterChef (Brazilian TV series)
Brazilian television series based on British television series
Brazilian reality television series
Brazilian cooking television series
Rede Bandeirantes original programming